Anna Torsani (born October 10, 2001) is a Sanmarinese alpine skier from Borgo Maggiore, San Marino. She focuses on the events of slalom skiing. She is one of two athletes to represent San Marino at the 2022 Winter Olympics.

Torsani was the flagbearer for San Marino at the 2022 Winter Olympics, along with fellow alpine skier Matteo Gatti.

Personal life 
Along with alpine skiing, Torsani is a graduate student in Nursing Sciences.

References

External links 
 

2001 births
Living people
Sammarinese female alpine skiers
Alpine skiers at the 2022 Winter Olympics
Olympic alpine skiers of San Marino
People from Borgo Maggiore